The Baro-Bhuyans (or Baro-Bhuyan Raj; also Baro-Bhuians and Baro-Bhuiyans) were confederacies of soldier-landowners in Assam and Bengal in the late Middle Ages and the early modern period. The confederacies consisted of loosely independent entities, each led by a warrior chief or a landlord (zamindars). The tradition of Baro-Bhuyan is peculiar to both Assam and Bengal and differ from the tradition of Bhuihar of Uttar Pradesh and Bihar—in Assam this phenomenon came into prominence in the 13th century when they resisted the invasion of Ghiyasuddin Iwaj Shah and in Bengal when they resisted Mughal rule in the 16th century.

Baro denotes the number twelve, but in general there were more than twelve chiefs or landlords, and the word baro meant many. Thus, Bhuyan-raj denoted individual Bhuyanship, whereas Baro-Bhuyan denoted temporary confederacies that they formed. In times of aggression by external powers, they generally cooperated in defending and expelling the aggressor.  In times of peace, they maintained their respective sovereignty.  In the presence of a strong king, they offered their allegiance. In general each of them were in control of a group of villages, called , and the more powerful among them called themselves raja. The rulers of the Bhuyanships belonged to different ethnic, religious or social backgrounds.

In 13th century Brahmaputra valley the system of Baro-Bhuyan Raj (confederacy) was formed from the petty chieftains—the remaining fragments of the erstwhile Kamarupa state. They often resisted foreign invasions (Ghiyasuddin Iwaj Shah in the 13th century), removed foreign rule (Hussain Shah in the 16th century) and sometimes usurped state power (Arimatta in the 14th century). They occupied the region west of the Kachari kingdom in the south bank of the Brahmaputra river, and west of the Chutiya kingdom in the north bank. These included areas of Nagaon, Darrang and Sonitpur districts. Subsequently, the Baro Bhuyan rules ended in the 16th century as they were squeezed between the Kachari kingdom and the Kamata kingdom in the west and were slowly overpowered by the expanding Ahom kingdom in the east.

In Bengal, the most prominent Baro-Bhuyan confederacy was led by Isa Khan of Sonargaon in the 16th century, which emerged during the disintegration of the Bengal Sultanate in the region, as a resistance to the Mughal expansion. They carved the land of Bhati and other areas of Bengal into twelve administrative units or Dwadas Bangla. The Baro-Bhuyans gradually succumbed to the Mughal dominance and eventually lost control during the reign of emperor Jahangir, under the leadership of Islam Khan I, the governor of Bengal Subah.

Baro-Bhuyans of Assam
Epicgraphic sources indicate that the Kamarupa state had entered a state of fragmentation in the 9th century when the tradition of granting away police, revenue and administrative rights to the donee of lands became common. This led to the creation of a class of landed intermediary between the king and his subjects—the members of which held central administrative offices, maintained economic and administrative links with in their own domain and propagated Indo-Aryan culture. This gave rise to the condition that individual domains were self-administered, economically self-sufficient and capable of surviving the fragmentation of central authority, when the Kamarupa kingdom finally collapsed in the 12th century.

 claims that the Baro-Bhuyan emerged in the 13th century from the fragmented remains of the Kamarupa chieftains.  Nevertheless, not all local Kamarupa administrators (samanta) became Bhuyans and many were later-day migrant adventurers from North India. 
Though there exists many legendary accounts of the origin of the Baro Bhuyan these accounts are often vague and contradictory.

The Adi Bhuyan group
This original group is often referred to as the Adi Bhuyan, or the progenitor Bhuyans. The Adi-charita written in the late 17th century is the only manuscript which mentions about the Adi-Bhuyan group. However, Maheswar Neog has called the account as spurious or fabricated.

Nevertheless, their presence is recorded in the Ahom Buranjis, where it is recorded that they were instrumental in ending the rule of the Kachari and Chutia kingdom. As a reward, the Ahom king Suhungmung (1497–1539) settled these Bhuyans in Kalabari, Gohpur, Kalangpur and Narayanpur as tributary feudal lords. Over time, these Bhuyans grew very powerful but they were later subjugated by the Ahom king Jayadhwaj Singha. The Saru Baro Bhuyan is a branch of the Bar Baro Bhuyan that split and went west. 

By the mid 16th century, all the Adi Bhuyans power was crushed, and they remained satisfied with what service they could render to the Ahom state as Baruwas or Phukans, Tamulis or Pachanis. During the first expedition of Chilarai against the Ahom kingdom, they aligned with the Ahoms (which Chilarai lost), but during the second expedition they aligned with the Koches (which Chilarai won). Chilarai appointed Uzir Bamun, Tapashi Laskar and Malamulya Laskar as Rajkhowas in Uttarkula after he annexed the territories up to Subansiri river in 1563 AD. This group was finally subjugated by Prataap Singha in 1623, who relocated them to the south bank of the Brahmaputra. The Saru Bhuyans, who had moved west after the conflict with the Bor Baro-Bhuyans trace the genealogy of Candivara to Kanvajara, the eldest son of Sumanta, but this is not given credence.

The Later group
The later Baro-Bhuyans had ensconced themselves between the Kachari kingdom in the east and the Kamata kingdom in the west on the south bank of the Brahmaputra river. According to Neog, the leader (shiromani) of the group, Chandivara, was originally a ruler of Kannauj, who had to flee due to Firuz Shah Tughlaq's 1353 campaign against Shamsuddin Ilyas Shah and reached Gauda, the domain of Dharmanarayana. As a result of a treaty between Dharmanarayana and Durlabhnarayana of Kamata kingdom, a group of seven Kayastha (Kalita) and seven Brahmin families led by Candivara was transferred to Langamaguri, a few miles north of present-day Guwahati. During the harvesting season in Lengamaguri, the Bhutiyas attacked and looted the country and in one instance the Bhutiyas captured Rajadhara, the son of Candivara. Candivara chased the Bhutiyas as far as Daimara between Maguri (near Changsari town) and Dewangiri (in Bhutan), killed few of them and released his son from captivity. In next four or five years, the people of Lengamaguri finding that Bhutiyas were planning an attack in retaliation decided to hand over Candivara as the person responsible for the massacre of the Bhutiyas. The Bhutiyas chased Candivara as far as Rauta (in present-day Udalguri district) but had to suffer defeat at the hands of the Baro-Bhuyans. Candivara and his group in search of a safe haven did not stay in Lengamaguri for long and moved soon to Bordowa in present-day Nagaon district with the support of Durlabhnarayana.  Among the descendants of Candivara was Srimanta Sankardeva. 

After the death of Candivara, Rajadhara became the Baro-Bhuyan. During the late 14th century, Gadadhara Bar-bhuya, the younger brother of Rajadhara in order to increase his influence collected an army in Bordowa and attacked the Chutiyas and Khamtis but was held captive, he was later set free and had to settle in Makhibaha (in present-day Nalbari district).

A second group of five Bhuyans joined the Candivara group later. In due course, members of these Bhuyans became powerful. Alauddin Husain Shah, who ended the Khen dynasty by displacing Nilambar in 1498, extended his rule up to the Barnadi river by defeating Harup Narayan who was a descendant of Gandharva-raya, a Bhuyan from the second group established by Durlabhnarayana at Bausi (Chota raja of Bausi), among others. The Baro-Bhuyans retaliated and were instrumental in ending the rule of Alauddin Husain Shah via his son Shahzada Danyal.  But very soon, the rise of Biswa Singha of the Koch dynasty in Kamata destroyed their hold in Kamrup and squeezed those in the Nagaon region against the Kacharis to their east. They had to relocate to the north bank of the Brahmaputra in the first quarter of the 16th century, to a region west of the Bor Baro-Bhuyan group. The increasing Koch and Ahom conflicts further ate away at their independence and sovereignty.

Baro-Bhuiyans of Bengal
At the end of the Karrani Dynasty (1564–1575), the nobles of Bengal became fiercely independent. Sulaiman Khan Karrani carved out an independent principality in the Bhati region comprising a part of greater Dhaka district and parts of Mymensingh district. During that period Taj Khan Karrani and another Afghan chieftain helped Isa Khan to obtain an estate in Sonargaon and Mymensingh in 1564. By winning the grace of the Afghan chieftain, Isa Khan gradually increased his strength and status and by 1571, the Mughal Court designated him as the ruler of Bhati.

Bhati region
Mughal histories, mainly the Akbarnama, the Ain-i-Akbari and the Baharistan-i-Ghaibi refers to the low-lying regions of Bengal as Bhati.

This region includes the Bhagirathi to the Meghna River is Bhati, while others include Hijli, Jessore, Chandradwip and Barisal Division in Bhati. Keeping in view the theatre of warfare between the Baro-Bhuiyans and the Mughals, the Baharistan-i-Ghaibi mentions the limits of the area bounded by the Ichamati River in the west, the Ganges in the south, the Tripura to the east; Alapsingh pargana (in present Mymensingh District) and Baniachang (in greater Sylhet) in the north. The Baro-Bhuiyans rose to power in this region and put up resistance to the Mughals, until Islam Khan Chisti made them submit in the reign of Jahangir.

Isa Khan
Isa Khan was the leader of the Baro Bhuiyans (twelve landlords) and a zamindar of the Bhati region in medieval Bengal. Throughout his reign he put resistance against Mughal invasion. It was only after his death, when the region went totally under Mughals.

The Jesuit mission who sent to Bengal managed to identify that 3 of the chieftains were Hindus, they were Ramchandra Basu of Chandradwip, Bakla (Barisal), Sripur of southeastern Dhaka (another source record the chief was Kedar Rai of Vikrampur), and Pratapaditya of Chandechan, Jessore while the rest were Muslims during Isa Khan's rule. Nalini Kanta Bhattasali affirms that there were more than twelve Bhuiyans, with the word baro signifying a large number. Bhattasali identifies the following as members of the Baro-Bhuiyans of Bengal, based on his findings from Jadunath Sarkar's articles:
 Musa Khan of Sonargaon; inheritor of Isa Khan
 Khwaja Usman of Bokainagar, Mymensingh and later Uhar, Sylhet
 Masum Khan Kabuli of Chatmohar, Pabna; succeeded by his son Mirza Mumin Khan
 Dariya Khan
 Madhu Ray of Khalsi, western Dhaka
 Raja Ray of Shahzadpur, Pabna
 Nabud/Madan Ray of Chandpratap, Dhaka
 The Ghazi family in Bhawal, north of Dhaka, consisted of Fazl Ghazi with his son and inheritor, Bahadur Ghazi (who controlled a large river fleet which was important in Isa Khan's resistance against Mughal forces) along with Anwar Ghazi and Sona Ghazi.
 Pahlawan of Matang in southwestern Sylhet
 Bayazid of Sylhet 
 Anwar Khan of Baniachong, southwestern Sylhet
 Majlis Qutb of Fatehabad
 Raja Ramchandra Basu of Chandradwip, Bakla (Barisal) (see Conquest of Bakla)
 Pitambar and Ananta of Chila-Jowar, Rajshahi
 Bahadur Khan of Hijli
 Alabakhsh of Alaipur, Rajshahi
 Raja Ananta Manikya of Bhulua (Noakhali) (see Conquest of Bhulua)
 Pratapaditya of Jessore
 Shamsuddin Baghdadi, later joined the Mughals
 Raja Satrajit of Bhusna, later joined the Mughals

Notes

References

 
 
 
 
 
 
 
 

History of Assam
Medieval Bengal
Rulers of Bengal